Karatyaki (Qaratäkä) is a rural locality (a selo) in Starotukmaklinsky Selsoviet, Kushnarenkovsky District, Bashkortostan, Russia. The population was 370 as of 2010. There are 4 streets.

Geography 
Karatyaki is located 21 km southwest of Kushnarenkovo (the district's administrative centre) by road. Syultyup is the nearest rural locality.

References 

Rural localities in Kushnarenkovsky District